Daniel Anthony Noriega, (born September 29, 1989) better known under the stage name Adore Delano, is an American drag queen, singer-songwriter, and television personality. Noriega appeared as a contestant on the sixth and seventh season of American Idol in 2008 and later competed as Adore Delano on the sixth season of RuPaul's Drag Race, placing in the final three. Delano then went on to compete on the second season of RuPaul's Drag Race All Stars, placing ninth after voluntarily leaving the competition. Delano has recorded and released three studio albums: Till Death Do Us Party (2014), After Party (2016), Whatever (2017), and one EP Dirty Laundry (2021).

Early life
Noriega was born to Bonnie Pimentel Noriega in Glendora, California and raised in Azusa, California, and attended Sierra High School, a continuation school for at-risk teenagers.

Career

2008–2009: American Idol and early work 

In 2008, Noriega appeared on the seventh season of American Idol, making it to the semi-finals. They became known for their flamboyant personality and sassy rapport with the judges, notably a comment towards judge Simon Cowell, which later went viral. After watching him on Idol, Rosie O'Donnell invited Noriega to perform on her R Family Vacations cruise. Talk show host Ellen DeGeneres also invited Noriega to be a guest on her show.

Following American Idol, Noriega became a YouTube personality, performing skits in drag as Adore Delano, or Angel Baby, another drag character. In June 2009, Noriega released the music video for song "24/7," featuring sister Diamonique.

2010–present: RuPaul's Drag Race and albums

After seeing RuPaul's Drag Race contestant Raven perform at the nightclub Micky's in West Hollywood, Delano was inspired to enter a drag competition at the club, later winning it. Following the win, Noriega started performing in Southern California as Adore Delano. Along with other RuPaul's Drag Race contestants, Adore walked the Marco Marco runway for Los Angeles Fashion Week in 2013. In December 2013, Logo announced that Adore Delano was among 14 drag queens who would be competing on the sixth season of RuPaul's Drag Race. Delano had previously competed for the season 5 fan-vote, ultimately losing to Penny Tration. Delano eventually went on to win three challenges and made it to the final three. Along with Courtney Act, Delano finished as runner-up to season winner Bianca Del Rio.

Immediately following the finale of Drag Race, Delano released the single "DTF" on May 20, 2014, as the lead single from their debut album Till Death Do Us Party. The full album was released on June 3, 2014, charting at number three on the US Dance/Electronic Albums chart, 11 on the US Independent Albums chart, and number fifty-nine on the Billboard 200. They released music videos for the majority of its tracks, including "I Adore U", which peaked at 49 on the US Billboard Dance/Electronic Songs.

In November 2014, Delano announced that a second album was in the works with an anticipated 2015 release date. In May 2015, Delano announced they had started writing sessions for the album.

Delano's album, After Party, was set for release March 11, 2016. The first single, "Dynamite", was released on February 26, 2016; the second, "Take Me There", was released on March 10, 2016; and the third, "I.C.U.", was released on September 1, 2016. Adore was one of ten contestants on the second season of RuPaul's Drag Race: All Stars, but chose to leave the show in the second episode for personal reasons. Delano's third studio album, Whatever, was released on August 18, 2017.

In early 2019, Delano appeared as a guest for the first challenge in the premiere of season eleven of Drag Race. In June 2019, a panel of judges from New York magazine placed her sixth on their list of "the most powerful drag queens in America", a ranking of 100 former Drag Race contestants. Later that year, in August, Delano was featured on the cover of Gay Times. In December of that year, Delano joined the cast of the fourth season of Ex on the Beach appearing as both Danny and Adore.

Personal life
Noriega came out as gay at 12 years old. In a 2012 interview, she said she is not opposed to dating women. As of 2017, Noriega identifies as non-binary and uses any pronouns. Noriega says that "gender isn't a real thing... it's just something they came up with to categorize and control people".

Lawsuit
On April 4, 2017, Delano filed a lawsuit against former management company, Producer Entertainment Group, alleging Delano had earned $2.5 million over the past three years, though only about $300,000 was actually paid. P.E.G. counter-sued in January 2018, alleging Delano owed the company $180,000 in management fees. The suit was dismissed by a judge who awarded no money to either party.

Discography

 Till Death Do Us Party (2014)
 After Party (2016)
 Whatever (2017)
Dirty Laundry (2021)

Tours

Headlining
Till Death Do Us Party Tour (2014–2015)
After Party Tour (2016–2017)
Birthday Tour (2017)
Whatever Tour (2018)
Time Hop Party Tour (2018)
A Pizza Me Tour (2019)
The Beautiful Idiots Tour (2020)
Dirty Laundry Tour (2021)
Party Your World Tour (2022-2023)

Co-headlining act
Battle of the Seasons 2015 Condragulations Tour (2015) (with RuPaul's Drag Race Cast)
Battle of the Seasons 2016 Extravaganza Tour (2016) (with RuPaul's Drag Race Cast)
ABCD Tour (2018) (with Bianca Del Rio, Courtney Act, and Darienne Lake)
Heels of Hell Tour (2019)
The Annual Halloween Sickening Ball Australia (2020)

Promotional
After Party UK Promo Tour (2016)
The Ghost of Ohio United Kingdom Tour – opening for Andy Black (2019)

Awards and nominations 

!
|-
!scope="row"| 2014
| Adore Delano
| Drag Queen of the Year
| 
| align="center"|
|}

Filmography

Film

Television

Web series

Music videos

References

External links

 
 Danny Noriega at IMDb
 

Living people
21st-century American singers
American Idol participants
American musicians of Mexican descent
American YouTubers
Hispanic and Latino American drag queens
Hispanic and Latino American musicians
LGBT Hispanic and Latino American people
LGBT people from California
American LGBT rights activists
American LGBT singers
LGBT YouTubers
People from Azusa, California
Non-binary musicians
Adore Delano
American gay musicians
Adore Delano
YouTube vloggers
Music YouTubers
YouTubers who make LGBT-related content
Singers from California
Actors from California
American drag queens
Non-binary drag performers
21st-century American LGBT people
1989 births